The Romano R-82 was a two-seat intermediate and aerobatic trainer designed by Etienne Romano with production aircraft built by Chantiers aéronavals Étienne Romano.

Design and development

The prototype Romano R-80.01 was a private venture design by Chantiers aéronavals Étienne Romano for a two-seat aerobatic biplane to use as a demonstrator. Tested in 1935 with a 179 kW (240 hp) Lorraine 7Me radial engine it was later fitted with a 209 kW (280 hp) Salmson 9Aba radial and re-designated the R-80.2. The R.80.2 was a biplane with a fixed tailwheel landing gear and with the change of scope to a tandem two-seat dual-control aerobatic trainer it was re-designated the R.82.01. Two more prototypes were built which were sold to private owners. Romano became part of the nationalised SNCASE in 1937 and the French Air Force ordered the R-82 into production with 147 aircraft being delivered. The French Navy also ordered 30 R-82s and all Air Force and Navy aircraft had been delivered by May 1940.

In 1938 two aircraft were ferried to Spain and used by the Spanish Republican government in the fight against the Nationalist faction.

Operators

 French Air Force
 French Navy

Spanish Republican Air Force

Specifications (R-82)

See also

References

External links

Third Reich troops and captured Romano R.82 aircraft

1930s French military trainer aircraft
R.82
Single-engined tractor aircraft
Biplanes
Aircraft first flown in 1936